The Plough at Eaves is a public house on Eaves Lane in Eaves, Lancashire, a hamlet of Woodplumpton. It is owned by Thwaites Brewery.

Dating to 1625, when it was a free house, it is believed to be the oldest pub in Lancashire.

At one time the pub was named the Plough at Cuddy Hill, or the Cuddy Pub. Cuddy Hill references an area rather than a village. There was a Battle of Cuddy Hill in 1546, and the Plough is said to stand somewhere on the battlefield. It was also used as a refuge by the opposing sides in the 1648 Battle of Preston.

Another of its early names was the Cheadle Plough Inn.

The main bar is in the larger of the two sections of the pub. A smaller bar is in the fieldstone portion of the building.

The pub had a K6-style red telephone box outside until around 2017. A pedestal-style post box from around the 1960s remains.

Gallery

References

External links
Official website at Thwaites.co.uk
The Plough at Eaves at Geograph.co.uk

Pubs in Lancashire
Buildings and structures in the City of Preston
1625 establishments in England
Restaurants in Lancashire